Ianique dos Santos Tavares (born 20 May 1988), commonly known as Stopira, is a Cape Verdean professional footballer who plays for Hungarian club Fehérvár FC as a left-back.

Club career
Stopira was born in Praia. In 2008, he signed for Portugal's C.D. Santa Clara from local Sporting Clube da Praia, playing just six matches in his first season but being first choice in the following, as the Azores team competed in the Segunda Liga.

On 10 July 2010, after a thwarted transfer to Primeira Liga club Vitória de Guimarães, Stopira signed a four-year contract with Deportivo de La Coruña in Spain, with 75% of his right being owned by IberSports. He spent his only season, however, with the reserves in the Segunda División B.

Stopira joined newly-promoted C.D. Feirense ahead of the 2011–12 campaign, on a one-year deal. He made his debut in the Portuguese top flight on 20 August 2011, coming on as a late substitute in a 3–1 away loss against S.L. Benfica.

In the summer of 2012, moved to Videoton FC in Hungary. He remained there until his retirement, notably winning the 2014–15 and 2017–18 editions of the Nemzeti Bajnokság I.

International career
Stopira received his first call-up to the Cape Verde national team in May 2008, for a friendly with Luxembourg and a 2010 FIFA World Cup qualifier against Cameroon. He was an unused substitute in the first two qualifying matches, and made his competitive debut against Mauritius on 22 June of that year, replacing Nando in the dying minutes.

On 24 May 2010, Stopira appeared in a friendly in Covilhã with Portugal – who were preparing for the FIFA World Cup in South Africa – playing the entire match as the minnows (ranked 117th) managed a 0–0 draw. He also won the 2009 Lusofonia Games with the under-21 team.

Personal life
Stopyra received his nickname in honour of former French international Yannick Stopyra. In December 2019, he acquired Hungarian citizenship via naturalization.

Career statistics

Club

International goals
 Cape Verde score listed first, score column indicates score after each Stopira goal.

References

External links

1988 births
Living people
Naturalized citizens of Hungary
Sportspeople from Praia
Cape Verdean footballers
Association football defenders
Sporting Clube da Praia players
Primeira Liga players
Liga Portugal 2 players
C.D. Santa Clara players
C.D. Feirense players
Segunda División B players
Deportivo Fabril players
Nemzeti Bajnokság I players
Fehérvár FC players
Cape Verde international footballers
2015 Africa Cup of Nations players
2021 Africa Cup of Nations players
Cape Verdean expatriate footballers
Expatriate footballers in Portugal
Expatriate footballers in Spain
Expatriate footballers in Hungary
Cape Verdean expatriate sportspeople in Portugal
Cape Verdean expatriate sportspeople in Spain
Cape Verdean expatriate sportspeople in Hungary